A monogenetic volcanic field is a type of volcanic field consisting of a group of small monogenetic volcanoes, each of which erupts only once, as opposed to polygenetic volcanoes, which erupt repeatedly over a period of time. The small monogenetic volcanoes of these fields are the most common subaerial volcanic landform.

Many monogenetic volcanoes are cinder cones, often with lava flows, such as Parícutin in the Michoacán-Guanajuato volcanic field, which erupted from 1943 to 1952. Some monogenetic volcanoes are small lava shields, such as Rangitoto Island in the Auckland volcanic field. Other monogenetic volcanoes are tuff rings or maars. A monogenetic field typically contains between ten and a hundred volcanoes. The Michoacán-Guanajuato field in Mexico contains more than a thousand volcanoes and is exceptionally large.

Monogenetic fields occur only where the magma supply to the volcano is low or where vents are not close enough or large enough to develop plumbing systems for continuous feeding of magma. Monogenetic volcanic fields can provide snapshots of the underlying region beneath the surface, and may be useful in studying the generation of magma and the composition of the mantle since the single eruption produced would match that of the chamber from which it erupted. The magma supplying such fields is thought to have rapidly ascended from its source region, with only short resident times (decades or less) in shallow magma chambers.

Examples

Auckland volcanic field, underlying much of the city of Auckland, New Zealand
Wells Gray-Clearwater volcanic field, east-central British Columbia, Canada
Honolulu Volcanic Series, Hawaii, United States
Boring Lava Field, in and near Portland, Oregon, United States
Michoacán-Guanajuato volcanic field (includes El Jorullo and Parícutin), Michoacán, Mexico
Vulkan Eifel, Germany
Chaîne des Puys, France
Carrán-Los Venados, Chile
North and north-eastern area of Gran Canaria, Canary Islands, Spain
Southern Volcanic Zone of Tenerife, Canary Islands, Spain
 Newer Volcanics Province, South-eastern Australia
 Kachchh volcanic plugs, Gujarat India
 Maahunui Volcanic System, Canterbury Basin, South Island of New Zealand
 Cat Hills volcanic field in New Mexico, United States

References

 
Volcanology